William Lyon Mackenzie Collegiate Institute (W.L. Mackenzie C.I.; locally known as Mackenzie) is a semestered high school located in Toronto, Canada. The school was opened in 1960 by the North York Board of Education. It is located near Sheppard Avenue West and Allen Road, close to Sheppard West subway station.

History
The school, originally called Southview Heights Secondary School, was built in 1959. The purpose of the school was twofold: to accommodate the skyrocketing number of new students in the area, and to ease overcrowding at Northview Heights Secondary School. The school opened in September 1960. It was originally slated to be a junior high school.

A contest for the school's name was held and William Lyon Mackenzie, the first mayor of Toronto and leader of the Upper Canada Rebellion in 1837, was selected.

The school, in its inception, had 90% of the Jewish student population that lived in the Bathurst Manor neighborhood.

Students
The school is known for the high academic standards of its students. The Fraser Institute ranks it as the best TDSB secondary school. Over 95% of its graduating students are accepted into a post-secondary institution. Additionally, 50% of graduating students earn an 80% average in all of their subjects (down from 66% in 2006, when the average was based on the top three subjects), qualifying them to become Ontario Scholars. In 2013, the students with the highest averages in the entire TDSB were Mackenzie students Geoffrey Yu and Ryan Gotesman, with averages of 99.7%.

The school is also known for its student-run organization, SWITCH (Solar and Wind Initiatives Towards CHange). Founded in 2006, SWITCH's goal is to make Canada more environmentally friendly through various environmental initiatives — the most prominent of which is the installation of solar panels and wind turbines on school grounds.  Through this organization, Mackenzie has gained national media attention due to events featuring David Suzuki, Steven Page of the Barenaked Ladies, MuchMusic and members of Sum 41.

Specialty programs

MaCS Program
The MaCS Program began in 1985; it offers enriched English, Mathematics, Science and Technology courses for advanced students. Students applying for the MaCS Program must undertake an entrance exam and complete a comprehensive application package. The MaCS Program begins at grade nine and runs until grade twelve. Students may apply in grade 8 for a spot in the grade 9 class. Students may also apply in grade 9 for a spot in the grade 10 class, although for a reduced number of spots. A significant number of the school's students are part of the MaCS Program - there are 90 positions for students joining the MaCS program in grade nine. The acceptance rate for the MaCS program was 12.8% for the 2018–2019 school year. Students in the MaCS program can take Advanced Placement exams and start computer science courses in grade nine, which is a field that is normally not available until grade ten. The MaCS program was one of the first enriched math, science and technology programs created for secondary school students. Marc Garneau Collegiate Institute's TOPS program is similar. Bloor Collegiate Institute has also developed a similar TOPS program in recent years.

Gifted Program
The Gifted Program is an enriched program available to gifted students. The program begins at Grade Nine and runs until Grade Twelve. Five to ten percent of William Lyon Mackenzie's student population is part of the Gifted Program.

Advanced Placement (AP) Program
The Advanced Placement Program has been active at the school since 2002 with the AP Computer Science course (ICS 4U0).  AP Calculus and Chemistry has also been added to the school's Advanced Placement Program. The AP Biology and AP French will be implemented for students who wish to pursue enriched learning in 2011. As of 2018 the only available AP classes were Calculus, Economics, and Computer Science

FIT Program
The school offers a national certification program known as the FIT Program that will enable students to earn industry standard certifications in programming and engineering, and in Media & Communications Arts. The program is made possible through the Information and Communications Technology Council of Canada as part of the Education/Sector Council Partnership Project. Usually, it is the students in the MaCS program that attain the FIT certification. Students who completed all the required courses are eligible for the FIT Plus Certificate if they do a Cooperative component or summer internship in a field related to Engineering, Programming or Media Communication & Arts.

The following courses must be completed to receive the FIT Certificate: Computer Science (ICS 3U + ICS 4U), Cisco IT Essentials (TEJ 3M + TEJ 4M), Media Arts (TGJ 3M + TGJ 4M), and (for the FIT Plus certificate only) a co-operative education component.

Sports
The school's sports teams include: badminton, wrestling, rugby, boys' and girls' field hockey, boys' and girls' volleyball, boys' and girls' soccer, and boys' varsity baseball.

Clubs and Councils

 Animanga Club
 Athletic Council
 Baycrest-Mackenzie Partnership
 Biology Club
 Black Student Alliance Council
 Book Club
 Business Council (FBLA and Target Alpha)
 Central Arts Council
 Chemistry Club
 Choir
 Debate Club
 DECA
 DND Club
 Gardening Club
 History Club
 HOSA
 Jewish Culture Club
 Linguistics Club
 Mackenzie Chess Club
 Mackenzie Computer Programming Team
 Mackenzie Creative Writing Club
 Mackenzie Engineering Club
 Mackenzie Science Club
 Mac Radio Announcers
 Math Club
 MEDLIFE
 Model United Nations
 Physics Club
 Project Metropolis (school website)
 Rainbow Club
 Smash Club
 Student Council
 TED Club
 The Flounder (school satirical newspaper)
 The Lyon (school newspaper)
 Tree Huggers (ecology and Eco-activism)
 Yearbook Team
 Wellness @ MAC
 Women in Stem

Notable alumni

Honey Sherman - billionaire, wife of Apotex founder Barry Sherman
Mark S. Fox - University of Toronto computer science professor
Howie Mandel - comedian, actor, and host of Deal or No Deal. (Expelled, did not graduate)
Mark Adler  - Member of Parliament (2011–2015) for the Toronto riding of York Centre
Roman Baber - Member of Provincial Parliament (2018–Present) for the Toronto riding of York Centre
Chin Injeti - musician, music producer, member of Juno Award-winning 1990s R&B group Bass Is Base
Avery Saltzman - actor, co-artistic director of the Harold Green Jewish Theatre Company
Lorne Rubenstein - golf writer / expert
Jack Newman - pædiatrician and breastfeeding advocate
Karen Mock - human rights activist
Lorne Lofsky - jazz musician and professor
DerHova - music producer, founder of the group Temperance
Jerry Levitan - Emmy-winning producer
Matti Friedman - journalist and author
Mel Cappe - Officer of the Order of Canada (2002–2006)
David Bloom - former CEO, Shoppers Drug Mart
Yank Azman - actor
Jeanne Beker - Canadian television personality and magazine editor
Herbert L. Becker - actor, author, magician, TV producer
Tinsel Korey - actress in the Twilight series
Ben Mink - musician and composer
Alice Panikian - Miss Universe Canada 2006
Alex Shnaider - billionaire and philanthropist
Rayne Fisher-Quann - sex education activist

See also
List of high schools in Ontario

References

External links

 Official website
 MaCS Program
 Official announcements website
 SWITCH Initiative
 William Lyon Mackenzie Collegiate Institute on TOBuilt

Schools in the TDSB
High schools in Toronto
Educational institutions established in 1960
1960 establishments in Ontario